The Chatham snipe or Chatham Island snipe (Coenocorypha pusilla) is a species of wader in the family Scolopacidae.
It is endemic to the Chatham Islands of New Zealand, and is only found on a few islands in the south of the Chatham Islands group.

Its natural habitats are temperate forests and temperate grassland.

Chatham snipe feed by probing into the ground in search of worms, amphipods, insects and larvae.

Scientific discovery

In 1868 the Chatham snipe was collected by naturalist Charles Traill and was sent to ornithologist Walter Buller who described it as a new species of snipe. On an exploratory mission to the islands in 1871, Henry Travers only found the snipe on Mangere Island. Attempts to return snipe to main Chatham Island would be hampered by the presence of introduced mammals and of weka, which are predators of snipe chicks.

References

External links
BirdLife Species Factsheet
Chatham Island snipe discussed on RNZ Critter of the Week, 14 October 2016

Coenocorypha
Birds of the Chatham Islands
Birds described in 1869
Taxa named by Walter Buller
Taxonomy articles created by Polbot
Endemic birds of New Zealand